Grace Tame (born 28 December 1994) is an Australian activist and advocate for survivors of sexual assault. Tame was named 2021 Australian of the Year on 25 January 2021.

Early life, family and education
Grace Tame was born in Hobart in about 1994. Her father is former Tasmanian cricketer Michael Tame.

In 2013, Tame dropped out of St Michael's Collegiate, and later re-enrolled at a different high school. She then moved to the United States, where she graduated from Santa Barbara City College with degrees in theatre arts and liberal arts.

Abuse and aftermath
Tame was a dual-scholarship holder at St Michael's Collegiate girls' school in Hobart, and had been diagnosed with anorexia in Year 10. She was groomed when she was 15 and then repeatedly sexually abused by her 58-year-old teacher, Nicolaas Bester. Although the school was found to have had multiple opportunities to intervene, the abuse did not stop until Tame reported her attacker. Nicolaas Bester was arrested and convicted of the offence of "maintaining a sexual relationship with someone under the age of 17", a crime, Tame argued, that needed to be renamed as in other jurisdictions due to its misleading use of the word "relationship" for abuse. He was also sentenced for possessing child pornography. In sentencing Tame's abuser, Justice Helen Wood said Tame had been "particularly vulnerable given her mental state" and that her abuser "knew her psychological condition was precarious" and had "betrayed the trust of the child's parents and the school's trust in an utterly blatant fashion." At the time of the abuse, Tame had undiagnosed autism spectrum disorder.

In 2017, social commentator Bettina Arndt conducted an interview with Tame's abuser claiming "sexually provocative behaviour from female students". Tame criticised Arndt for supporting her abuser, accusing her of "trivialising" and "laughing off" his crime, saying, "Not only is the interview disturbing because it gives a platform to a paedophile. It's not a truthful interview." Arndt did not seek out Tame for her side of the story, and published her name and photo without consent. Her abuser had spoken publicly about the case many times, but Tame was gagged by Tasmanian law. He was subsequently jailed again for the production of child exploitation material, after describing online how he sexually abused Tame.

Advocacy
Tasmania's Evidence Act had prohibited publication of information identifying survivors of sexual assault since 2001. In practice, this prevented Tame and other survivors speaking publicly about their experiences, even as Tame's abuser bragged about his crimes on social media. Tame's case led to journalist and sexual assault survivor advocate Nina Funnell working alongside Tame to create a campaign called #LetHerSpeak, in partnership with Marque Lawyers and End Rape on Campus Australia, seeking to overturn this law and a similar law in the Northern Territory. The campaign attracted global support from celebrities including Alyssa Milano, Tara Moss and John Cleese, and from leaders of the MeToo movement. In August 2019, Tame spoke out for the first time after the campaign obtained a court order on her behalf through the Supreme Court of Tasmania winning Tame an exemption from the gag law. She was the first female sexual assault survivor in Tasmania to win a court order to speak about her experience.

In October 2019, in response to the #LetHerSpeak campaign led by Funnell and featuring Tame, Attorney-General of Tasmania Elise Archer announced that legislation would be amended to allow sexual assault survivors to publicly speak out. Archer also announced planned changes to the wording of the crime noting that "the word relationship has connotations of consent." In April 2020, the law was changed to allow Tasmanian survivors to speak out.

Tame has become an advocate for others, focusing on helping them understand grooming and psychological manipulation and breaking down the stigma associated with sexual assault. She has assisted the Los Angeles Human Trafficking Squad with understanding how child grooming works. Tame advocates education as a means of primary prevention of child sex abuse, rather than too heavily focusing on responses, which can "fuel the unconscious belief that child sexual abuse is just a fact of life that we have to accept in our society". Tame wants to eradicate victim blaming and normalise speaking out, and says greater consistency is needed between federal and state laws.

On 15 March 2021, Tame led the Women's March4Justice event in Hobart.

On 9 February 2022, Tame and former Liberal Party parliamentary staffer and alleged rape survivor Brittany Higgins gave an address at the National Press Club of Australia, which sold out quickly and garnered a huge amount of coverage in the press and on social media. In her talk, Tame revealed that a "senior member" of a government-funded organisation had phoned her and, she felt, in a threatening way, asked her not to criticise the Prime Minister in her outgoing Australian of the Year speech, in the light of the forthcoming election. Both women advocated strongly for structural change, saying the time for talking was past.

Grace Tame Foundation
In December 2021, Tame founded the Grace Tame Foundation which aims for cultural and structural change to eradicate sexual abuse of children. Tame, her fiancé Max Heerey, and step-father, Ron Plaschke are board directors for the foundation.

Writing 
In September 2022 her memoir, The Ninth Life of a Diamond Miner, was published by Macmillan Australia. It was shortlisted for the Nonfiction prize at the 2023 Indie Book Awards.

Recognition and public profile

2021 Australian of the Year
In October 2020, Tame was named Tasmanian Australian of the Year 2021. She said, "I could be wrong but I don't think that a survivor of rape has ever been awarded in such a way and that's huge." "It's hugely empowering for that community recognising and normalising the act of speaking out. There's no shame in surviving. The shame sits at the feet of predators, of perpetrators of these crimes."

On the eve of Australia Day 2021, she was named Australian of the Year. The panel said, "Grace has demonstrated extraordinary courage, using her voice to push for legal reform and raise public awareness about the impacts of sexual violence." She is the first Tasmanian recipient of the award and the first as a public survivor of sexual assault. Upon receiving the award, she said "All survivors of child sexual abuse, this is for us... When we share, we heal. Together we can end child sexual abuse. I remember him saying, 'Don't make a sound.' Well, hear me now, using my voice amongst a chorus of voices that will not be silenced." Her speech was praised as "powerful" and "extraordinary".

Other recognition

In 2021, Tame was named as one of Time magazine's Next Generation Leaders, and by the Australian Financial Review as one of the "10 most culturally powerful people in Australia in 2021".

Tame was featured on the cover of the May 2021 Australian issue of Marie Claire magazine. She was the first non-celebrity to appear on the magazine's cover in its 25-year history.

A portrait of Tame by Kirsty Neilson was a finalist in the 2021 Archibald Prize. Neilson was inspired by Tame's passion, strength, and bravery in playing an instrumental role in changing Tasmania's gag law.

Press coverage of appearances
On Australia Day 2022, Tame was photographed with a frosty expression while meeting Prime Minister Scott Morrison. Several commentators criticised this, calling her "childish" and "rude", while others praised her integrity. Tame herself stated that "the survival of abuse culture is dependent on submissive smiles and self-defeating surrenders" and she was not willing to wear the "consequences of civility for the sake of civility".

Personal life
In 2017, Tame married American actor Spencer Breslin. They later divorced. Since late 2020, she has been in a relationship with Tasmanian Max Heerey. Tame met Heerey through the running and cycling app Strava. On 22 January 2022, Tame announced her engagement to Heerey via Instagram and Twitter. She has referred to Heerey as her "biggest supporter" and "true soulmate".

Tame is a visual artist, and her clientèle has included actor John Cleese, and musician Martin Gore. She is also a yoga teacher and long-distance runner, having won the 2020 Ross Marathon in a course record time.

She has a younger brother, Oscar, whom she calls her "little hero", saying, "He came into the world right when the abuse started, and pardon the pun, but he was a literal saving grace".

References

Further reading

1994 births
Australian of the Year Award winners
Australian painters
Living people
People from Hobart
Sexual abuse victim advocates
People on the autism spectrum
Santa Barbara City College alumni